This is a list of defunct airlines of Myanmar.

See also
 List of airlines of Myanmar
 List of airports in Myanmar

References

Myanmar
Airlines
Airlines, defunct